The Nissan Livina is an MPV model produced by the Japanese automobile manufacturer Nissan. It was introduced in July 2006 by Dongfeng Nissan at the Guangzhou International Motor Show and went on sale in December 2006. Sharing the same platform with the first-generation Note, the first-generation Livina was the first Nissan vehicle to debut in China before being released in other countries.

The first-generation Livina was available in two body lengths, with the longer one designed to accommodate three-row seating. It was built in Brazil, Malaysia, Indonesia, Philippines, Vietnam, South Africa, China and Taiwan.



First generation (L10/L11; 2006)

L10 (2006) 
The regular length two-row model with a shorter rear overhang is called the Livina or Livina XR, or in Taiwan as Livina Urban or Livina Sport, while the extended length three-row model with a longer rear overhang is called Livina Geniss in China or Grand Livina elsewhere. The longer three-row model is a station wagon-styled MPV, while the two-row model is considered as a roomy hatchback or a European-style mini MPV.

The model debuted in November 2006 in China in its three-row guise under the name Livina Geniss, while the two-row model was introduced in the country in April 2007.

The two-row Livina was introduced in Taiwan in October 2007. Both the two-row Livina and the three-row Grand Livina was also produced in South Africa since January 2008, where forty percent of the vehicle parts were locally sourced, with the rest coming elsewhere, mainly Indonesia.

Power for the Livina comes from 1.5-litre, 1.6-litre or 1.8-litre four-cylinder engines that are shared with the Tiida/Latio/Versa (C11). The 1.5- and 1.6-litre engines are paired with either a 5-speed manual or 4-speed automatic. The 1.8-litre option is paired with either a 6-speed manual or 4-speed automatic transmission.

Livina Geniss/Grand Livina 
The Livina Geniss in China or Grand Livina in other countries is a three-row model with longer rear overhang. The Grand Livina was launched in Indonesia on April 5, 2007. It was initially available in 1.5 SV, 1.5 XV, 1.8 XV and 1.8 Ultimate grade levels. Later, the 1.5 S and 1.5 Ultimate, as well as the sporty 1.5 and 1.8 Highway Star with body kit were added into the lineup. The Indonesian market Grand Livina received its facelift on February 10, 2011, while the Highway Star Autech was launched on September 27, 2011 with redesigned grille and bumper. On August 31, 2012, the 1.5 XV and 1.5 Ultimate grades received the same grille and bumper as the Highway Star Autech.

Only the 1.8-litre engine is offered in the Philippines and Brazil, while the South African market get the 1.6-litre variant.

In Malaysia, the Grand Livina was launched in December 2007 with two engine options: HR16DE (manual and automatic) and MR18DE (automatic only). A "Tuned by Impul" edition was made available in January 2009. In June 2011, the facelifted variants was launched. Changes included: new front grille, black dashboard opposed to beige and instrument faces finished in white opposed to black. Later the same month, the "Tuned by Impul" version was updated. In July 2012, an "Autech" variant was introduced.

Livina X-Gear/C-Gear 
In April 2008, a crossover-styled variant was released as the Livina C-Gear in China. It is marketed as the Livina X-Gear elsewhere. Based on the regular two-row Livina, the X-Gear is decorated with unpainted body claddings, side body garnish, rugged-style bumpers and roof rails. The Livina X-Gear was also introduced in Indonesia in May 2008, in South Africa in 2008, in Brazil in August 2009, and in Malaysia in September 2011.

The variant is powered by a 1.6-litre HR16DE engine, except in Indonesia where it is equipped with a 1.5-litre HR15DE engine. In Brazil, a 1.8-litre engine option was also offered.

2011 update 

On August 25, 2010, the updated models of both the Livina and Livina Geniss were launched in China.

On February 10, 2011, the updated models of the Grand Livina were launched in Indonesia by Nissan Motor Indonesia. Changes mainly focused on minor exterior changes such as the front grille, wheel design and other changes, while interior changes involved color changes from beige and brown to black. The facelifted Grand Livina Highway Star was launched on September 27, 2011. On August 31, 2012, the XV and Ultimate shared the same sporty Autech front bumper as the Highway Star, but full body kits and sporty alloy wheels are exclusive for the Highway Star only.

The L10-series Livina were still offered in Brazil and South Africa after the L11-series Livina models were introduced in China and Southeast Asian countries.

L11 (2013) 
Spy shots of the L11-series Livina were published online on October 8, 2012. The L11-series Livina was first introduced in China at the 15th Shanghai International Automobile Industry Exhibition in April 2013, with redesigned front and rear fascias.

On May 29, 2013, the L11-series Grand Livina and Grand Livina X-Gear were launched in Indonesia. Locally marketed as an all-new model, the L11 models have revised front end, front fenders and rear panels with distinctive taillights and trunk garnishes. The Grand Livina X-Gear comes with different front bumpers, black over fenders, black body cladding and roof rails. The CVT option replaced the 4-speed automatic transmission in this model. Grade levels for the Indonesian market Grand Livina are SV, XV and Highway Star. The 1.5-litre HR15DE engine is equipped with dual injectors and dual variable valve timing control (CVTC), while the 1.8-litre MR18DE engine was only available for the X-Gear and retained the 6-speed manual or regular 4-speed automatic transmissions. Nissan Motor Indonesia decided to end the production of the Grand Livina X-Gear with 1.8-litre engine, citing lack of demand.

The L11-series Grand Livina for the Malaysian market has the 1.6-litre engine and 1.8-litre engine. The 1.6-litre manual Grand Livina has since been discontinued in Malaysia.

The L11-series two-row Livina C-Gear was introduced in China, and later also available as the X-Gear in other markets including Indonesia, Malaysia, Thailand and Taiwan.

Second generation (ND1W; 2019) 

The second-generation Livina was launched in Indonesia on February 19, 2019, a month after Nissan ceased the production of the L11 Grand Livina in the country. A byproduct of Renault–Nissan–Mitsubishi Alliance, it is a rebadged and restyled variant of the Mitsubishi Xpander and manufactured alongside it by Mitsubishi Motors plant in Cikarang, West Java. Nissan used the "Livina" name for this model due to the established nameplate usage in the country.

As it is based on the Xpander, it is only offered in one body variant and has crossover SUV-like proportions compared to previous generation's low slung station wagon-like proportions. Compared to the Xpander, Nissan has redesigned several body panels including the Nissan's V-Motion grille, headlights, front bumper, front fenders, front side doors, rear bumper, rear tailgate metal sheet casing and taillight internals.

The second-generation Livina is available in four grade levels: E, EL, VE and VL. In June 2020, the Sporty Package for the VE grade was made available in 100 units. The E grade was discontinued in 2021.

The second-generation Livina was also launched in the Philippines on September 6, 2022 in left-hand drive form and is imported from Indonesia.

Sales

References

External links 

  (Indonesia)

Livina
Cars introduced in 2006
2010s cars
2020s cars
Minivans
Hatchbacks
Front-wheel-drive vehicles
Vehicles with CVT transmission
Cars of Brazil